Francis "Frank" Adams (October 29, 1953 – November 11, 1987) was a sprinter from Trinidad and Tobago who specialized in the 100 metres.

Biography
He participated twice in the Olympic Games. In 1976 in Montreal, he reached the semi final with the 4 x 100 metres relay team, together with Christopher Brathwaite, Anthony Husbands, and Charles Joseph. At the 1980 Summer Olympics in Moscow, Adams participated in the 100 metres where he went out in the opening round.

Adams died at age 34 from gunshot wounds in Port of Spain.

References 

 Best of Trinidad
 

1953 births
1987 deaths
Trinidad and Tobago male sprinters
Athletes (track and field) at the 1976 Summer Olympics
Athletes (track and field) at the 1980 Summer Olympics
Olympic athletes of Trinidad and Tobago
Male murder victims
Deaths by firearm in Trinidad and Tobago
Trinidad and Tobago murder victims
People murdered in Trinidad and Tobago